Risala Weekly is a weekly Islamic magazine published in Kozhikode. The magazine was first published in November 1983 as a monthly publication. Later its frequency was switched to weekly. It is published by Islamic Publishing Bureau of Sunni Students' Federation from Kozhikode, India.

References

External links
 Official website

Islamic magazines
Islamic media in India
Kerala State Sunni Students' Federation
Magazines established in 1983
Malayalam-language magazines
Monthly magazines published in India
Weekly magazines published in India
1983 establishments in Kerala